The George N. Proctor House in Union County, Kentucky near Waverly, is an antebellum Greek Revival-style house built around 1854.  It was listed on the National Register of Historic Places in 1990.

It is located on Kentucky Route 1180 east of its junction with Proctor Rd.

It is "a two and one-half story, double-pile Greek Revival house of brick common bond construction", upon a stone foundation.

References

National Register of Historic Places in Union County, Kentucky
Greek Revival houses in Kentucky
Houses completed in 1854
1854 establishments in Kentucky
Houses on the National Register of Historic Places in Kentucky